Sugözü is a village in Anamur district of Mersin Province, Turkey. The population of Sarıağaç is 196  as of 2011.

References

Villages in Anamur District